The 2012–13 Fresno State Bulldogs men's basketball team represented Fresno State University during the 2012–13 college basketball season. This was head coach Rodney Terry's second season at Fresno State. The Bulldogs played their home games at the Save Mart Center and were first year members of the Mountain West Conference. They finished the season 11–19, 5–11 in MWC play to finish in seventh place. They lost in the quarterfinals of the Mountain West tournament to Colorado State.

2012–13 Team

Roster
Source

|-
|13
|Blake Williams
|6'2"
|205
|G
|Fr.
|Fresno, CA, U.S.

Coaching Staff

2012–13 Schedule and Results
Source

|-
!colspan=9| Exhibition

|-
!colspan=9| Regular season

|-
!colspan=9| 2013 Mountain West Conference men's basketball tournament

References

Fresno State
Fresno State Bulldogs men's basketball seasons
Fresno
Fresno